Alan Gibbons Weston (30 September 1907 – 10 June 1997) was an English cricketer. Weston was a right-handed batsman. He was born at Leicester, Leicestershire.

Weston made his first-class debut for Leicestershire against Warwickshire at Edgbaston in the 1933 County Championship, with him making two further first-class appearances in that season against Sussex and Surrey. The following season he made two first-class appearances against the touring Australians and Lancashire in the County Championship. In his five first-class matches for Leicestershire, Weston scored 72 runs at an average of 9.00, with a high score of 31 not out.

He died at Blythe Bridge, Staffordshire on 10 June 1997.

References

External links
Alan Weston at ESPNcricinfo
Alan Weston at CricketArchive

1907 births
1997 deaths
Cricketers from Leicester
English cricketers
Leicestershire cricketers